Immaculata High School was an all-girls Catholic high school located at W. McNichols and Wyoming Ave. in Detroit, Michigan, United States.  The school was opened in 1941 and was operated by the Sisters, Servants of the Immaculate Heart of Mary.  The school closed in 1983.

References

High schools in Detroit
Defunct Catholic secondary schools in Michigan